Viking Stavanger may refer to:
IL Viking, a defunct multi-sports club from Stavanger and its former departments:
Viking FK, an association football club from Stavanger
Viking HK, a team handball club from Stavanger
Viking IK, a defunct ice hockey club from Stavanger